Douglas Lake, also called Douglas Reservoir, is a reservoir created by an impoundment of the French Broad River in Eastern Tennessee. This lake is located only a few miles from the Pigeon Forge/Gatlinburg area, and also the Great Smoky Mountains National Park.

The Douglas Dam was built by the Tennessee Valley Authority at a record pace from February 2, 1942, through February 19, 1943, to provide hydroelectric power and to control flooding downstream in the Tennessee River Valley. The Douglas Lake reservoir inundates about a   stretch of the French Broad River between the Douglas Dam and the Irish Bottoms area near Newport. Small portions of the Nolichucky and Pigeon rivers are also impounded by the lake. During the winter months, the Tennessee Valley Authority lowers the water level to help control flooding, meet power demands, and many other objectives. This is important to know in advance to make plans to stay near the lake. 

The resort town of Baneberry is located on the northern shores of the lake in Jefferson County. Dandridge, the county seat of Jefferson County, is located mostly on the northern shores with a small portion on the southern.  Parts of downtown Dandridge are located below the lake's operating levels, and are protected by an earthen dam.

References

External links

Douglas Lake Fishing Map

French Broad River
1943 establishments in Tennessee
Tennessee Valley Authority
Reservoirs in Tennessee
Protected areas of Cocke County, Tennessee
Protected areas of Hamblen County, Tennessee
Protected areas of Jefferson County, Tennessee
Protected areas of Sevier County, Tennessee
Bodies of water of Cocke County, Tennessee
Bodies of water of Hamblen County, Tennessee
Bodies of water of Jefferson County, Tennessee
Bodies of water of Sevier County, Tennessee